Brede Bomhoff (born 30 July 1976) is a retired Norwegian football defender.

External links

NIFS

1976 births
Living people
Norwegian footballers
Odds BK players
Sportspeople from Skien

Association football defenders